The Bréguet Aerhydroplane was a large experimental flying boat developed in France in 1912. It proved to be underpowered and never flew.

Huge for its day, it was a parasol-wing monoplane of canard configuration (described in some sources as a tandem wing design on account of the wide span of the foreplane relative to the mainplane) with a single tractor propeller turned by a chain drive from an engine located within the hull. The hull was designed for Bréguet by Alphonse Tellier and featured wide sponsons. The empennage was the cruciform tail common to early Bréguet designs. Christened La Marseillaise, it was displayed at the Salon de l'Aéronautique in 1912 and demonstrated at Monaco by Bréguet in 1913 along with his more conventional H-U2 and H-U3 seaplanes. Here, it proved itself capable of maneuvering on water, but not of actually taking off, its 97 kW (130 hp) engine being incapable of making its 2,000 kg (4,410 lb) weight airborne. All development was abandoned at this point.

Specifications

References

Notes

Bibliography

External links
Description and sketch in Flight journal November 1912

1910s French experimental aircraft
Flying boats
Aerhydroplane
Single-engined tractor aircraft
Canard aircraft
Parasol-wing aircraft